Pseudagrion salisburyense is a species of damselfly in the family Coenagrionidae. It is found in Angola, Botswana, Ethiopia, Kenya, Malawi, Mozambique, Namibia, Somalia, South Africa, Tanzania, Uganda, Zambia, Zimbabwe, and possibly Burundi. Its natural habitats are subtropical or tropical moist lowland forests, dry savanna, moist savanna, subtropical or tropical dry shrubland, subtropical or tropical moist shrubland, and intermittent rivers.

References

Coenagrionidae
Insects described in 1921
Taxonomy articles created by Polbot